Blue is the debut studio album by Oxygiene 23, released on April 11, 1995, by Fifth Colvmn Records.

Music
Prior to releasing Blue, the band had recorded the song "Sacrifice" and released it to Invisible Records for their compilation Can You See It Yet?. The album's theme is inspired by mythology and its music informed by new-age and trance music, with wind instrument performances recorded by Christopher Hall of Stabbing Westward and Mars Williams of The Waitresses. After the album was released the song "Good for You" was included on the various artist compilation Forced Cranial Removal by Fifth Colvmn Records.

Reception 

John Bush of AllMusic said "Die Warzau members Jim Marcus and Van Christie sidestepped industrial for this side project including jazz, Eastern musics and a wide range of percussion." Sonic Boom described the music as "soft, happy, percussive and very lulling" and that the "wind instruments percolate, extravagant electronic and live percussion filter through the fresh spring breeze, and female vocals dance through meadows."

Track listing

Personnel 
Adapted from the Oxygiene 23 liner notes.

Oxygiene 23
 Van Christie – programming, guitar, engineering (1-6, 11, 12)
 Jane Jensen – vocals, programming
 Jim Marcus – drums, percussion, flute, saxophone, piano

Additional performers
 Dale Andrew – additional percussion
 Seu Bang – guitar
 Christopher Hall – trumpet
 Jason More – additional percussion
 Mars Williams – tenor saxophone

Production and design
 Keith Banks – mastering
 Zalman Fishman – executive-production
 Chris Morford – engineering (8, 10)
 Scott Ramsayer – engineering (7, 9)

Release history

References

External links 
 Blue at Discogs (list of releases)

1995 debut albums
Fifth Colvmn Records albums